Clarence Hufton (25 March 1912 – 2002) was an English professional footballer who played in the Football League for Mansfield Town.

References

1912 births
2002 deaths
English footballers
Association football midfielders
English Football League players
Mansfield Town F.C. players